Alon Ilsar is a composer, producer, drummer, instrument designer and electronic percussionist.

Based in Sydney, Australia for the greater portion of his musical career, Alon is most well known for performing in Company B's award winning musical, Keating! which toured Australia from November 2006 until August 2008. During Keating!'s successful season, Alon was awarded an Australia Council for the Arts grant to fund his choose-your-own adventure style musical game piece, The Colors Interactive Comeback Show which was performed at the Adelaide Fringe Festival, the Melbourne International Comedy Festival and the Sydney Comedy Festival He has also received an Australia Council for the Arts grant to design and build a new electronic percussion instrument called the 'Air Sticks'.  In 2010, he performed with Meow Meow at the Edinburgh Fringe Festival and joined Aronas, brainchild of Australian Jazz Bell Award winner, Aron Ottignon for their European tour.

His theatre credits also extend to his performance as the drummer and sound designer in Sam Atwell's play Bondi Dreaming, the touring production Barrel of Monkeys (Strut'n'Fret), touring with Circus Monoxide as musical director, drummer and keys player, improvising drums in Spontaneous Broadway, and composing and sound designing for Emergence.

Other diverse projects he has been involved in include The Colors Tribute Band, Gauche, Trigger Happy, Foley, Horse Feathers, The Renovators, The BZNZZ, Pugsley Buzzard, Darth Vegas, Gl;tch Jukebox, The Rescue Ships, Brian Campeau, Dave Sattout, Killsong, the Belvoirs, Donne, The Ben Romalis Trio, and The Tango Saloon.

He is currently performing in the new musical Misanthropology written and directed by Eddie Perfect and Meow Meow's Feline Intimate.

Discography 
The Colors Tribute Album Vol. 1 - Various Artists 2009
The Musical - Keating! 2008
Transylvania - The Tango Saloon 2008
Trigger Happy - Comatone + Foley 2007
Keating! - Company B Original Cast Recording 2007
Quiet Music For Quiet People - Inga Liljestrom 2006
Re-fashioned 007 (The James Bond Themes Go Under Cover) - Various Artists 2006
Siesta Cinema - Gauche 2006
Gl;tch Jukebox - Gl;tch Jukebox 2006
Super Shiny Sydney - Various Artists 2006
Trampled: The Elefant Traks Remix Album - Various Artists 2006
Southern Winter, Northern Summer (Feral Media Sampler) - Various Artists 2005
Repainted - Gauche 2005
The Tango Saloon - The Tango Saloon 2005
Ideophone - Foley 2005
Paints Lane - Gauche 2005
Darth Vegas - Darth Vegas 2003
Sigh - Gauche 2003
Parallel Universe - The Church 2002
Chit - Yuklidt 1999

See also
Music of Australia

References

External links 
 Alon Ilsar
 Trigger Happy
 Foley
 Gauche
 The Colors
 Darth Vegas

Living people
Australian drummers
Male drummers
Year of birth missing (living people)